Paul Alexis Raymond de la Croisette, called Charles (Paris, 14 April 1796 – Paris, 10 July 1849) was a 19th-century French playwright.

Biography 
An archivist at the French Chamber of Deputies, his plays, often signed Charles, were presented on the most important Parisian stages of his lifetime: Théâtre de l'Odéon, Théâtre du Vaudeville, Théâtre du Gymnase-Dramatique etc.

Following a trial with the management of the Théâtre du Vaudeville related to the play La leçon de Mathématiques,  none of his plays was ever presented.

Œuvres 

1817: L'hôtel Bazancourt, vaudeville en 1 acte, 1817
1820: Les marieurs écossais ou Une matinée à Gretna-Green, comédie vaudeville in 1 act
1820: La Suite du Folliculaire ou l'Article en suspens, comédie-vaudeville in 1 act, with Armand d'Artois, Langlé, Eugène Scribe and Théaulon
1821: Le Baptême de village, ou le Parrain de circonstance, vaudeville in 1 act, with de Bury, Chavagnac and Ledoux
1821: La Créancière, comédie-vaudeville in 2 acts, with Emmanuel Théaulon
1822: Les Femmes romantiques, comédie-vaudeville, avec Théaulon, 1822
1822: Une journée à Montmorency, tableau-vaudeville in 1 act, with Théaulon and Ferdinand Langlé, 1822
1822: Une visite aux Invalides, à-propos mingled with couplets on the occasion of Saint-Louis's day
1823: Le Magasin de lumière, scènes à-propos de l'éclairage par le gaz, with Langlé, Mathurin-Joseph Brisset and Théaulon
1823: Le comte d'Angoulême, ou Le siège de Gênes, with Fulgence de Bury, Michel-Joseph Gentil de Chavagnac and Paul Ledoux
1823: Le siège de Gênes, comédie héroïque in 2 acts, with Chavagnac, Ledoux and de Bury
1824: Mr Manuel, 1824 
1824: Mes derniers vingt sols, vaudeville in 1 act, with Théaulon
1824: Grétry, opéra-comique in 1 act, with de Bury and Ledoux
1825: Le Béarnais, ou la Jeunesse de Henri IV, comedy in 1 act and in free verses, with de Bury and Ledoux
1826: La Fête du roi, ou le Remède à la goutte, comedy in 1 act and in verses, with Paul Ledoux 
1827: La leçon de mathématiques, comédie-vaudeville in 1 act 
1828: J'épouse ma femme, vaudeville in 1 act
undated: Mon rêve, ou J'étais ministre

Honours 
 Chevalier de la Légion d'honneur (14 mai 1845)
 Officier de la Légion d'honneur (23 mai 1848)

Bibliography 
 Joseph Marie Quérard, La France littéraire ou dictionnaire bibliographique, vol.7, 1835, p. 448 (Lire en ligne)

References 

19th-century French dramatists and playwrights
Writers from Paris
1796 births
1849 deaths